The Sudanese pound (abbreviation: LS in Latin,  in Arabic, historically also £Sd; ISO code: SDG) is the currency of the Republic of the Sudan. The pound is divided into 100 piastres (or qirsh in Arabic). It is issued by the Central Bank of Sudan.

The pound fell for the first time since 1997 after the United States imposed economic sanctions on Sudan. The Sudanese pound continued its decline to an unprecedented number, falling to LS 53 against the dollar. This situation, which drained all economic measures, led to heavy losses in the external repercussions of the Sudan as a whole, in the light of the government cut, interrupted by some of the failed actions announced by the Central Bank of Sudan, a severe shortage of liquidity.

The Sudanese pound fell against the US dollar after the Central Bank of Sudan announced the lifting of the cash reserve to counter inflation. Since the secession of South Sudan in 2011, Sudan has suffered from a scarcity of foreign exchange for the loss of three-quarters of its oil resources and 80% of foreign exchange resources. The Sudanese government quoted the official price of the dollar from LS 6.09 to LS 18.07 in the budget of 2018 and LS 375.11 in March 2021.

History

First pound (SDP) 
The first pound to circulate in Sudan was the Egyptian pound. The late 19th-century rulers Muhammad ibn Abdalla (the Mahdi) and Abdallahi ibn Muhammad (the Khalifa) both issued coins which circulated alongside the Egyptian currency. When Anglo-Egyptian rule in Sudan ceased on January 1, 1956, and Sudan became an independent country, a distinct Sudanese currency (the Sudanese pound) was created, replacing the Egyptian pound at par.

The Egyptian pound was subdivided into 100 piastres (Arabic: , singular qirsh, English: piastre, abbreviation: PT). The piastre used to be subdivided into 40 para, but decimalisation following the 1886 Egyptian currency reform established a  PT, which came to be known as a millim (abbreviated to mm/mms in Sudan). Due to this legacy, the post 1956 Sudanese pound was divided into 100 PT, each subdivided into 10mms.

During 1958-1978 the pound was pegged to the U.S. dollar at a rate of US$2.87156 per LS 1. Thereafter, the pound underwent successive devaluations.

The pound was replaced in 1992 by the dinar (SDD) at a rate of SD 1 = LS 10. While the dinar circulated in northern Sudan, in Southern Sudan, prices were still negotiated in pounds, whilst in Rumbek and Yei, the Kenyan shilling was more widely accepted as payment.

Second pound (SDG) 
According to the Comprehensive Peace Agreement between the government of the Republic of the Sudan and the Sudan People's Liberation Movement, the Central Bank of Sudan (CBOS) shall adopt a program to issue a new currency as soon as is practical during the Interim Period. The design of the new currency shall reflect the cultural diversity of Sudan. Until a new currency has been issued with the approval of the Parties on the recommendations of the CBOS, the circulating currencies in Southern Sudan shall be recognised. The second pound began introduction on 9 or 10 January 2007, and became the only legal tender as of July 1, 2007. It replaced the dinar at a rate of LS 1 = SD 100 (or 1 SDG = 1,000 SDP).

Third pound 

The third edition of the Sudanese pound was established on 24 July 2011 following the secession of South Sudan from the Republic of Sudan. On 1 September 2011, the Sudanese pound ceased to be legal tender in South Sudan.

For a wider history surrounding currency in the region, see British currency in the Middle East.

The Sudanese pound was devalued on 23 February 2021, with the official (indicative) exchange rate set to LS 375.08 per US dollar (from the fixed rate of LS 55), closing the gap between the commercial and black market exchange rates.

Coins

Local coinage in Sudan: issues of the Mahdi and Khalifa and of Darfur
In 1885, the Mahdi issued silver coins for 10 PT and 20 PT and gold 100 PT. These were followed by issues of the Khalifa in denominations of 10 para, 1 PT, 2 PT,  PT, 4 PT, 5 PT, 10 PT and 20 PT. These coins were initially minted in silver in 1885. Over the following eleven years, severe debasement occurred, leading to billon, then silver-washed copper and finally copper coins being issued. The coinage ceased in 1897.

During 1908–1914, a local coinage was issued in Darfur in western Sudan. These were issued under the authority of Ali Dinar and resembled contemporary Egyptian coins.

First pound
In 1956, coins were introduced in denominations of 1mm, 2mms, 5mms and 10mms, 2 PT, 5 PT and 10 PT. The millim denominations were struck in bronze, whilst the piastre denominations were in cupro-nickel. The 2mms, 5mms and 10mms were scallop shaped, although a round 5mms was introduced in 1971. The 1mm and 2mms were last struck in 1969, the last 5 millim in 1978. In 1983, brass 1 PT, 2 PT and 5 PT, a reduced size 10 PT and a cupro-nickel 20 PT were introduced. In 1987, aluminium-bronze 1 PT, 5 PT, 10 PT, 20 PT, 25 PT and 50 PT and LS 1 were introduced, with the 25 PT and 50 PT being square and octagonal in shape, respectively. In 1989, stainless-steel 25 PT and 50 PT and LS 1 were issued. This is the general pattern, in addition to these coins there are collector-oriented issues and various oddities. See popular coin catalogues for details.

Sudanese dinar
See Sudanese dinar.

Second pound
Coins in denominations of 1 PT, 5 PT, 10 PT, 20 PT and 50 PT were introduced alongside the  circulating dinar coins. The Central Bank of Sudan states that the 5 PT coins are yellow coloured (perhaps aluminium-bronze) and the 10 PT is silver coloured (made of stainless steel). The 20 PT and 50 PT coins are bi-metallic, with the 20 PT yellow ringed with a silver coloured centre and the 50 PT the opposite.

Banknotes

First pound

In April 1957, the Sudan Currency Board introduced notes for 25 PT, 50 PT, LS 1, LS 5 and LS 10. Note production was taken over by the Bank of Sudan in 1961. LS 20 notes were introduced in 1981, followed by denominations of LS 50 in 1984 and LS 100 in 1988.

Sudanese dinar
When introduced on 8 June 1992, the Sudanese dinar replaced the first Sudanese pound at a rate of 1:10.

Questionable new notes 
In 2005, the National Public Radio of the United States reported that forces in southern Sudan were printing pound notes bearing the name "Bank of New Sudan", but there is no such bank. In addition, numbers of the banknotes had duplicate serial numbers. Their legitimacy is questionable.

Second pound
When introduced on 10 January 2007, the second Sudanese pound replaced the Sudanese dinar at a rate of 1:100. This new currency was mandated by the 2005 Comprehensive Peace Agreement signed between the Sudanese government and the Sudan People's Liberation Movement to end the country's 21- year civil war. Deputy Governor Badr-Eddin Mahmoud said the cost to print the new currency was US$156 million. Banknotes of LS 1, LS 2, LS 5, LS 10, LS 20 and LS 50 were issued. The LS 1 note was replaced by a coin at the end of November 2011.

Third Pound

Banknotes of the third pound are similar in style to those of the second pound but with changes in colour scheme, the removal of certain symbols associated with the south and a redrawn map of the country after the secession of the south.

New banknotes
On 1 January 2019, the Central Bank of Sudan announced Sudanese pound banknotes of LS 100, LS 200 and LS 500 will be released this month as the country grapples with a severe economic crisis and cash shortage.

A new LS 100 banknote was unveiled on 28 January 2019 by the Central Bank of Sudan.

A new LS 200 Sudanese pounds banknote was unveiled on 5 February 2019 by the Central Bank of Sudan.

A new LS 500 banknote dated March 2019 was issued in 2019 and a LS 1,000 banknote dated June 2019 was issued on 7 June 2022

See also
 Economy of South Sudan
 Economy of Sudan
 South Sudanese pound

References

External links
 Sudan launches new pound
 The banknotes of Sudan (Sudanese pound) 
 The banknotes of Sudan (Sudanese dinar) 

History of Sudan
Economy of Sudan
1992 disestablishments
Currencies introduced in 2007